Birchwood Blue Hills Charter School (BBHCS) is a small charter school located in Birchwood, Wisconsin. Founded in 2009 the BBHCS started out with nine students. Today that has over doubled with 26 students. The BBHCS is focused on Project-based learning, with student-led projects instead of lectures and classes. The BBHCS also celebrates a low student, adviser ratio of approximately 15:1 to ensure a personal, helpful relationship between student and adviser.

References

External links
 

Educational institutions established in 2009
Schools in Washburn County, Wisconsin
2009 establishments in Wisconsin